CCFF can stand for:
 Canadian Cystic Fibrosis Foundation
 Common Compiler Feedback Format
 Le Congrès de la Culture Française en Floride, an academic competition for students of French held in Orlando, Florida
 The letters "C C F F" occur at the four count in SMPTE Universal Leader